Call the Gun Expert is a British crime television series which first aired on BBC 1 in 1964. It consisted of a single series of six episodes featuring Wensley Pithey as Robert Churchill, a ballistics expert who solves a number of crimes based on real-life historical cases. Pithey frequently starred in police procedurals, and was well known to audiences for his role as Detective Superindendent Charlesworth. The scripts were written by journalist Macdonald Hastings who also narrated he series.

Other actors who appeared in individual episodes of the series include Petronella Barker, Kenneth Benda, Paddy Joyce, Robert Cawdron, David Swift and Norman Mitchell.

References

Bibliography
 Pitts, Michael R. Famous Movie Detectives III. Scarecrow Press, 2004.

External links
 

BBC television dramas
1964 British television series debuts
1964 British television series endings
1960s British crime television series
English-language television shows